Danish Aziz (born 20 November 1995) is a Pakistani cricketer. He made his international debut for the Pakistan cricket team in April 2021.

Early life
Born in Karachi into a Memon family, his father and siblings supported his interest in cricket, where his main inspiration is the former Indian international player Yuvraj Singh, his older brother Maroof Aziz having played some first-class cricket as well, and he pursued a Masters of Health and Physical Education program at Karachi University.

Career
He made his Pakistan Super League debut for Karachi Kings on 21 March 2018. He made his first-class debut on 12 December 2014 for Karachi Dolphins. He made his List A debut on 8 January 2017 for Karachi Whites in the 2016–17 Regional One Day Cup. He has also represented the Pakistan national under-19 cricket team. He made his international debut for Pakistan against South Africa in April 2021.

In 2018, he scored an unbeaten knock of 86, in a massive partnership of 192 runs with Fawad Alam, to help Karachi Whites win the final against Islamabad and clinch the National One-day Regional Cup. In April 2018, he was named in Sindh's squad for the 2018 Pakistan Cup.

In November 2020, he was named in Pakistan's 35-man squad for their tour to New Zealand. In January 2021, he was named in Pakistan's Twenty20 International (T20I) squad for their series against South Africa. In March 2021, he was named in Pakistan's limited overs squads for their tours to South Africa and Zimbabwe. He made his One Day International (ODI) debut for Pakistan, against South Africa, on 2 April 2021. He made his T20I debut on 21 April 2021, for Pakistan against Zimbabwe.

In December 2021, he was signed by Islamabad United following the players' draft for the 2022 Pakistan Super League.

References

External links
 

1995 births
Living people
Memon people
Pakistani cricketers
Pakistan One Day International cricketers
Pakistan Twenty20 International cricketers
Karachi Dolphins cricketers
Karachi Whites cricketers
Karachi Kings cricketers
Quetta Gladiators cricketers
Islamabad United cricketers
Cricketers from Karachi